NCIS is an adventure game developed by Ubisoft Shanghai and published by Ubisoft for Nintendo 3DS (as NCIS 3D), PlayStation 3, Wii, Microsoft Windows and Xbox 360 in 2011. It is based on the NCIS TV series.

Reception

The PC and PlayStation 3 versions received "mixed" reviews, while the Xbox 360 version and NCIS 3D received "unfavorable" reviews, according to the review aggregation website Metacritic.

References

External links
 
 

2012 video games
Adventure games
Detective video games
Naval video games
Nintendo 3DS games
PlayStation 3 games
Ubisoft games
Video games about police officers
Video games based on television series
Video games developed in China
Video games set in Washington, D.C.
Wii games
Windows games
Xbox 360 games